The Ibrahim Prize for Achievement in African Leadership, also known as the Ibrahim Prize, is an annual prize awarded to a former African Executive Head of State or Government on criteria of good governance, democratic election and respect of terms limits. Since its inception, the Prize has been awarded 7 times. It has often not been offered, no leader being found worthy of the award on a given year

Background
Established by the Mo Ibrahim Foundation in 2007, the Ibrahim Prize celebrates excellence in African leadership. It is awarded to a former Executive Head of State or Government by an independent Prize Committee composed of eminent figures, including two Nobel Laureates. Prize winners are referred to as Ibrahim Laureates.

The Ibrahim Prize
Recognises and celebrates African leaders who have developed their countries, lifted people out of poverty and paved the way for sustainable and equitable prosperity
Highlights exceptional role models for the continent
Ensures that Africa continues to benefit from the experience and expertise of exceptional leaders when they leave national office, by enabling them to continue in other public roles on the continent

Criteria
Former African Executive Head of State or Government
Left office in the last three years
Democratically elected
Served their constitutionally mandated term
Demonstrated exceptional leadership

Award 
Prize recipients are awarded US$5 million, divided into annual instalments of US$500,000 paid out over 10 years, followed by US$200,000 annually, thereafter.

With a US$5 million payment, the Ibrahim Prize, is believed to be the world's largest, exceeding the $1.5m Nobel Peace Prize. Former South African President Nelson Mandela, former United States President Bill Clinton, and former United Nations Secretary-General Kofi Annan are among those who have welcomed the initiative.

The Ibrahim Prize for Achievement in African Leadership has been awarded in 2007, 2008, 2011, 2014, 2017 and 2020. Former South African president Nelson Mandela was named an honorary laureate in 2007. Desmond Tutu was awarded a Special Prize for speaking truth to power in 2012.

Prize Committee
 Festus Mogae (Chair), former President of Botswana
 Aicha Bah Diallo, former Education Minister of Guinea
 Mohamed ElBaradei, Director General Emeritus, International Atomic Energy Agency
 Horst Köhler, former President of Germany
 Graça Machel, Former Education Minister of Mozambique
 Mary Robinson, former President of Ireland
Former Committee Chairs:

 Kofi Annan (2007-2011), former Secretary-General of the United Nations 

 Salim Ahmed Salim (2007-2020), former Prime Minister of Tanzania and Secretary General of the Organisation of African Unity
Former Committee members:

 Ngozi Okonjo-Iweala (2007-2008), Director-General of the World Trade Organization and former Finance Minister of Nigeria
 Martti Ahtisaari (2007-2019), former President of Finland

Laureates

See also

 List of awards for contributions to society

References

External links
 
The Dictator Index by Ken Auletta
Mike Jakeman, "Rewarding the Rich", The Oxonian Review

Governance and civic leadership awards
Awards established in 2007